Fred Breinersdorfer (born 6 December 1946 in Mannheim) is a German screenwriter, producer and film director.

Life 
Fred Breinersdorfer, born 1946 in Mannheim, Germany, studied law and sociology from the universities in Mainz and Tübingen and received a PhD from the University of Tübingen. As a young lawyer, Breinersdorfer started a practice as an attorney at law, specializing in constitutional and administration law in Stuttgart. In 1980, he started his writer's career with crime novels and film scripts. Breinersdorfer lost a close political race, running for Bundestag, the German Federal Parliament as a SPD candidate for the party of Willy Brandt. Until today he is fighting for author’s rights on the national and European level. Not only in this field, Breinersdorfer became one of the most politically influential writers in Germany. 2015 he was honoured with the Federal Cross of Merit. After the race for office in 1994 and ready for a change, he closed his law practice to become a full-time professional writer. He lives in Berlin, Germany and has two children, Leonie, a lawyer and writer, and Julian, an architect.

Work 
He wrote his first crime novel in 1980, which developed into a successful detective book and movie series about French attorney Jean Abel. His credits include 12 novels, a formidable list of short stories, theatrical productions, radio plays, and now 75 movies, prime-time TV movies, series and shorts. "Tatort" is in Germany for 45 years the most successful crime show with an average 9 million spectators every Sunday on prime time. Fred Breinersdorfer created more than 20 episodes. His own law crime series "Anwalt Abel" was brought on air by ZDF/ARTE between 1988 and 2001.

Since 2006 he also works as a film producer and director. He became world renowned as a writer and co-producer for "Sophie Scholl: The Final Days" when the movie was nominated for the 2006 Academy Award (Foreign Language Film). His newest feature as writer and producer, "13 Minutes", directed by Oliver Hirschbiegel, was released at the Berlinale 2015 and is already sold around the world and released in the US 2017 by Sony Classics. 2017 the screenplay of the movie was acquired by the Library of the Academy of Motion Picture Arts & Sciences (Margaret Herrick Library) for the permanent Core Collection. On the 2016 Berlinale his recent feature "The Diary of Anne Frank" has got its premiere. With this film Breinersdorfer has completed his trilogy about victims of the Nazi regime in Germany.

Fred Breinersdorfer was the president of the German Writer's Association (VS) and is currently a member of the German P.E.N. and the Deutsche Filmakademie. He was among others awarded the "German Film Award", the "Adolph Grimme Preis mit Gold" (known as the German TV Oscar), and nominated for several other prices.

Selected filmography
 1984: Tatort:  – directed by 
 1989: Quarantäne – directed by 
 1990:  – directed by 
 1994:  – directed by Bernd Schadewald
 1994:  – directed by 
 1996: Tatort: Schneefieber – directed by Peter Schulze-Rohr
 1999: Duell der Richter – directed by Jobst Oetzmann
 1999: Tatort: Mordfieber – directed by 
 2001:  – directed by Marc Rothemund
 2001: Tatort: Gewaltfieber – directed by 
 2002: Nachts, wenn der Tag beginnt – directed by Christian Görlitz
 2003: Tatort: Der Schächter – directed by Jobst Oetzmann
 2005: Tatort: Die Spieler – directed by Michael Verhoeven
 2006: Sophie Scholl – The Final Days – directed by Marc Rothemund
 2005:  (after The Gambler by Fjodor Dostojewski) – directed by 
 2007: Tatort: Der Tote vom Straßenrand – cowriter: , directed by Rolf Schübel
 2008: Summersunday (short) – directed by Fred Breinersdorfer and Sigi Kamml
 2008: Between Tomorrow and Today – directed by Fred Breinersdorfer
 2009:  – cowriter: Léonie-Claire Breinersdorfer, directed by Nina Grosse
 2009: Andula – Besuch in einem anderen Leben (documentary) – directed by Fred Breinersdorfer und Anne Worst
 2011:  (after The Man from Beijing by Henning Mankell) – cowriter: Léonie-Claire Breinersdorfer, directed by Peter Keglevic
 2012: Tatort: Borowski und der freie Fall – directed by 
 2012: Tatort: Ein neues Leben – cowriter: Léonie-Claire Breinersdorfer, directed by 
 2015: 13 Minutes – directed by Oliver Hirschbiegel
 2016: The Diary of Anne Frank – directed by Hans Steinbichler
 2017: Ein Kind wird gesucht – cowriter , directed by Urs Egger
 2019: Die Spur der Mörder – cowriter Katja Röder, directed by Urs Egger
 2021: Ein Mädchen wird vermisst – cowriter Katja Röder, directed by 
 2022: München Mord: Dolce Vita – cowriter Katja Röder, directed by

Awards 
 1985 Walter-Serner-Preis for Pack schlägt sich (shortstory)
 1991 Adolf-Grimme-Preis Best Writing, for Der Hammermörder
 2003 Adolf Grimme Award, Best Writing, for Final Hope
 2003 ver.di Fernsehpreis Best Writing, for Final Hope
 2005 Bavarian Film Awards, Best Producing, for Sophie Scholl – The Final Days
 2005 German Film Awards, Best Producing, for Sophie Scholl – The Final Days
 2005 German Film Awards, Nomination Best Writing, for Sophie Scholl – The Final Days 
 2005 European Film Awards, Nomination Best Producing, for Sophie Scholl – The Final Days
 2006 Academy Award (Foreign Language Film) Nomination for Sophie Scholl – The Final Days
 2007 The 58th Annual Christopher Award, Feature Film, for Sophie Scholl – The Final Days
 2008 Ostfriesischer Kurzfilmpreis Best Directing, Shortfilm Summersunday
 2008 Murnau Kurzfilmpreis Best Directing, Shortfilm Summersunday
 2010 Bernd Burgemeister Fernsehpreis Best Producing, for Der verlorene Sohn
 2012 Order of Merit of Baden-Württemberg
 2012 Eyes & Ears Award Best Writing, for Filmmakers in Prison der Deutschen Filmakademie
 2014 Order of Merit of the Federal Republic of Germany
 2015 Bavarian Film Awards, Best Producing, for 13 Minutes

External links

personal webpage 
Fred Breinersdorfer, writer of Sophie Scholl - The Final Days, speaks with the WSWS 17 August 2006 with Richard Phillips on the World Socialist Web Site

1946 births
Living people
Mass media people from Mannheim
Recipients of the Cross of the Order of Merit of the Federal Republic of Germany
Recipients of the Order of Merit of Baden-Württemberg